Andrew Van Vranken Raymond (8 August 1854 – 5 April 1918) was an American minister, educator and author; raised in the Dutch Reformed Faith in upstate New York. He was a graduate of Union College (Class of 1875), and was a pastor in the Dutch Reformed Church before becoming a Presbyterian minister. He later accepted the position as President of Union College (1894–1907).  He accepted a call to the First Presbyterian Church in Buffalo, NY where he served as pastor until his death.

Early life 
Raymond was born in Visscher's Ferry (near Schenectady, New York) on 8 August 1854 he was the son of Rev. Henry A. Raymond, a minister in the Dutch Reformed faith, and Catherine Maria (Miller) Raymond, he attended Troy High School and entered Union College in 1872 as a sophomore.  He was an earnest student and a talented athlete. He played baseball, edited the College Spectator, joined the Union Navy (boating club) and was a member of the Alpha Delta Phi fraternity, graduating in 1875, he then attended New Brunswick Theological Seminary in 1878.

Then on 24 September 1879, he married Margaret Morris Thomas of Middleville, NY, she died June 11, 1907; they had two sons and a daughter, Morris Thomas Raymond, Miriam Hotchkiss Raymond, and Andrew V.V. Raymond Jr.   He was pastor at the First Reformed church in Paterson, NJ from 1878 to 1881 before accepting a call that same year as pastor of Trinity Reformed Church in Plainfield, NJ from 1881 to 1887.  It was at this time he left the Dutch reformed faith and became a Presbyterian minister; he accepted a call to the Fourth Presbyterian Church in Albany, New York, and was installed 10 March 1887.

Union College 

Now close to his old Alma Mater, he became much more active in college activities and soon became president of the General Alumni Association too, a post that he maintained until he resigned his pastorate.
Although Dr. Raymond felt ministry was his true calling, he struggled with a personal decision for several weeks; because he had been offered the position as Union College president.  He finally came to a decision and accepted the offer as College President on May 5, 1894.  On 8 June 1894 he resigned from both the General Alumni Association President and as Pastor of the Fourth Presbyterian Church and began his Presidency at Union College.  He remained as president of Union College in Schenectady, NY officially from 8 June 1894 until 1907. While there, he was a member of the Schenectady Chamber of Commerce and not only was he able to restore Union College to sound financial health, but he boosted the science curriculum, by persuading General Electric's Charles Steinmetz to head the newly established Department of Electrical Engineering and Applied Physics, however, he began yearning to return to the ministry.  He offered his services as supply pastor and ended up taking leave of his burden to supply the pulpit at First Presbyterian Church in Buffalo, NY during his last years as president of Union College, while still supplying the pulpit as pastor, Dr. Raymond published his only book; “Union University, its history, influence, characteristics and equipment”. Shortly after its release, Dr. Raymond's wife died. He was of course at that time engaged to preach as the stated supply pastor at First Presbyterian Church and still served as president of Union College. He finally resigned from the presidency on July 18, 1907, after finally being persuaded to accept the call to First Presbyterian Church.

Pastor of First Presbyterian Church (1907-1918) 
Dr. Raymond was installed as senior pastor at 1st Presbyterian Church on December 6, 1907, at an installation service presided by Dr. E. H. Dickinson of North Presbyterian Church; Rev. William Waith, D.D., (the father of First Church Organist Dr. William S. Waith), read the scripture passages, and returning to the pulpit in the “New” First Presbyterian Church to preach the sermon was former pastor Rev. David R. Frazer, D. D., now Pastor of the First Presbyterian Church in Newark, NJ., also assisting in the service was Rev. Henry Ward, D. D., of East Church who offered the prayer of installation; Rev. William R. Taylor, D.D., of Rochester, NY, gave the charge; and Rev. Samuel V. V. Holmes, D. D. of Westminster Presbyterian Church, gave the charge to the people.

Dr. Raymond quickly became active in Western New York; on 1 February 1910 he was named Manager of the Buffalo State Hospital to succeed the deceased William C. Krauss, to complete his term which was to expire December 31, 1916.  This was no doubt because while serving at the Fourth Presbyterian church in Albany, NY he was appointed by Governor Higgins in 1905 as the manager of the New York State Hospital in Utica, New York.

World War One and an Unexpected Death 
With the outbreak of World War I and the United States entry into the war in 1917, Dr. Raymond asked and received leave of absence to preach at military camps, leaving Rev. William M. Boocock, Associate Minister in charge. However, this schedule took its toll on Dr. Raymond's health, under the strain of these duties.  In January 1918 he visited Clifton Springs to better his health and on died in early  April 1918, he died of a heart attack in Tyron (near Spartanburg, South Carolina) while visiting his son.  His death was a great shock to the congregation and the community.  In his pastime, Dr. Raymond enjoyed fishing, golf and was involved a variety of social clubs. Funeral services were held in the First Presbyterian Church on Monday, 8 April 1918 and were opened and conducted by Rev. William H. Boocock, D.D., with prayers offered by Drs. Holmes and Searle, with scripture readings by Drs. McLennan and Stone with an address by Dr. Alexander, a friend of over forty-five years, the benediction was given by retired pastor Rev. Samuel S Mitchell, D.D..    Prayers were also offered at the manse by Rev. P. T. Pockman, D.D.   Dr. Raymonds’ body lay in state in the sanctuary under the great dome through the afternoon and evening.

Publications

References 

 https://www.nytimes.com/1894/03/09/archives/reception-to-dr-raymond-dinner-given-to-him-by-union-college-alumnl.html
 https://www.nytimes.com/1902/07/04/archives/called-to-brooklyn-church-report-regarding-the-rev-andrew-vv.html
 https://www.nytimes.com/1918/04/06/archives/obituary-1-no-title.html
 Union College biography
 License for use is granted by the author under the GFDL fair use policy.
GFDL: <https://www.gnu.org/copyleft/fdl.html>
CC-BY-SA: <https://creativecommons.org/licenses/by-sa/3.0/>
  New York Times Obituary published 6 April 1918
  Some information obtained was condensed from Wayne Somers, compiler and editor, Encyclopedia of Union College History (Schenectady: Union College Press, 2003), page 599.  source: Union College website.
  Source: NY Times obit. Published 6/12/1907
  Source: Who's who in New York City and State, page 1082, pub. 1907
  Service arrangements described in the 14 April 1918 FPC Bulletin.

1918 deaths
1854 births
American Presbyterian ministers
Presidents of Union College (New York)